Camilo Ugo Carabelli was the defending champion but chose not to defend his title.

Juan Manuel Cerúndolo won the title after defeating Murkel Dellien 4–6, 6–4, 6–2 in the final.

Seeds

Draw

Finals

Top half

Bottom half

References

External links
Main draw
Qualifying draw

Challenger de Tigre - 1